Townsend is a town in Middlesex County, Massachusetts, United States. The population was 9,127 at the 2020 census.

History 
Townsend was first settled by Europeans in 1676 in an area known by indigenous people of the area as Wistequassuck, and was officially incorporated in 1732. The town was named after Charles Townshend, English secretary of state and an opponent of the Tories. The town initially used the same spelling as its namesake, but the "h" was dropped in patriotic fervor in response to the Townshend Acts of 1767. The current spelling of Townsend became official by 1780.

Geography
According to the United States Census Bureau, the town has a total area of 33.1 square miles (85.8 km), of which 32.9 square miles (85.1 km) is land and 0.2 square mile (0.6 km) (0.72%) is water.  The headwaters of the Squannacook River rise in the town's western hills. Townsend has the largest land area of any town in Middlesex County.

Townsend is bordered by Mason, New Hampshire and Brookline, New Hampshire to the north, Pepperell to the east, Groton and Shirley to the southeast, Lunenburg to the south, and Ashby to the west.

Route 119 runs east-west through Townsend, and Route 13 runs north-south.

Demographics

As of the census of 2010, there were 8,926 people, 3,240 households, and 2,483 families residing in the town. The racial makeup of the town was 96.7% White, 0.6% Black or African American, 0.2% Native American, 0.8% Asian, 0.0% Pacific Islander, 0.4% from other races, and 1.3% from two or more races. Hispanic or Latino of any race were 1.8% of the population.

There were 3,240 households, out of which 34% had children under the age of 18 living with them, 62.7% were married couples living together, 9.9% had a female householder with no husband present, and 23.4% were non-families. 18.4% of all households were made up of individuals, and 6% had someone living alone who was 65 years of age or older.  The average household size was 2.75 and the average family size was 3.14.

In the town, the population was spread out, with 24.9% under the age of 18, 5.4% from 18 to 24, 22.8% from 25 to 44, 34.8% from 45 to 64, and 9.6% who were 65 years of age or older.  The median age was 41.7 years. For every 100 females, there were 97.7 males.  For every 100 females age 18 and over, there were 95.8 males.

The median income for a household in the town was $76,533, and the median income for a family was $87,227. Males had a median income of $52,714 versus $35,843 for females. The per capita income for the town was $29,862.  About 3.3% of families and 5.2% of the population were below the poverty line, including 3.4% of those under age 18 and 3.1% of those age 65 or over.

Education
Townsend is part of the North Middlesex Regional School District, along with Ashby, and Pepperell. The town has one elementary school, the Spaulding Memorial Elementary School. The town has one middle school, Hawthorne Brook Middle School, which also serves as the middle school for neighboring Ashby. High School students then attend North Middlesex Regional High School. Students are also allowed to choose to attend Nashoba Valley Technical High School located in Westford.

Gallery

Notable people 

 Daniel Adams, physician, textbook author, and state legislator
 Christiana Bennett, former Ballet West principal ballerina
 John Kerin, professional baseball umpire
 Daniel LaPlante, Murderer
 Dave Miller, Professional darts player
 Huntley N. Spaulding, Governor of New Hampshire 
 Rolland H. Spaulding, Governor of New Hampshire
 Mary Walcott, witness at the Salem witch trials

References

Further reading
 1871 Atlas of Massachusetts. by Wall & Gray. Map of Massachusetts, Map of Middlesex County.
 History of Middlesex County, Massachusetts, Volume 1 (A-H), Volume 2 (L-W) compiled by Samuel Adams Drake, published 1879 and 1880. 572 and 505 pages. Townsend article by Ithamar B. Sawelle in volume 2, pages 381–390.
 Divinity and Dust: A History of Townsend, Massachusetts by Richard N. Smith (Lancaster, MA: The College Press, 1978)

External links

 Town of Townsend official website

 
Towns in Middlesex County, Massachusetts
Towns in Massachusetts
1676 establishments in Massachusetts